is a 2014 Japanese superhero anime film by Madhouse. The film is produced by SH DTV AC BW&P Partners, another partnering of Marvel Entertainment with Sony Pictures Entertainment Japan and Madhouse, following up on the Marvel Anime series. It was released in North America on Blu-ray, DVD, and digital on March 25, 2014.

Plot
Punisher busts black market weapons dealer Cain who is in possession of stolen S.H.I.E.L.D. technology and takes him hostage, inadvertently interfering with Black Widow's secret mission to uncover a larger terror plot under investigation by S.H.I.E.L.D. Widow attempts to subdue Punisher and Cain escapes during the altercation. S.H.I.E.L.D. take Punisher into custody. Having lost their sole lead, Director Nick Fury offers Punisher his freedom in exchange for going on mission with Widow to locate Cain and stop the global terrorist group known as LEVIATHAN, who plan to auction the stolen technology to the highest bidder.

Widow and Punisher track Cain to a Leviathan base in Slovenia, and discover a lab filled with pods containing spies who have been turned into super-powered soldiers by Orion. Punisher captures Cain, but the latter activates a special function on his cellphone that emits a blinding flash of light directly into Punisher's face and causes him to lose time. When Punisher comes to, Cain has escaped. Widow crosses paths with a former lover and ex-S.H.I.E.L.D. agent, Elihas Starr, who was presumed dead but has been working for Leviathan. He reveals himself as the creator of the super-soldier serum and confesses he did it to become worthy of being with her, hoping she would join him. Widow declines and they fight while Punisher detonates explosives around the base. Punisher extracts Widow and Elihas disappears. Punisher reveals Cain's stolen cellphone, but it is heavily encrypted and they are unable to retrieve any information from it. They take it to S.H.I.E.L.D. super-genius Amadeus who decrypts the phone, but unknowingly activates the flash function. When they come to, an emergency countdown signalling an impending explosion has been activated. Punisher suddenly attacks Widow and kills several S.H.I.E.L.D. agents. Unable to stop the countdown, Amadeus incinerates the cellphone, destroying it completely and causing Punisher to snap out of the trance he was under. Widow tells Fury about Elihas' brainwashing technology, suspecting it was controlling Punisher, and advocates against his imprisonment. Fury reveals prior knowledge of the Leviathan technology based on possibly compromised past S.H.I.E.L.D. projects about mind control that had never been fully implemented, informing Widow that she and Punisher were specifically assigned the mission because S.H.I.E.L.D. had contingencies in place should either or both of them be compromised. The same risk could not be taken with the Avengers due to the powerful nature of the tech. Fury also knows that Elihas stole classified data from S.H.I.E.L.D. including samples of the Avengers blood to use for his project. He orders Widow to complete the mission on her own.

Angered that Fury would sacrifice them both, Widow defies his orders and takes Punisher with her to Hong Kong to meet Ren, an information handler with ties to the criminal underworld, who gives them the auction's time and location: in Madripoor that same night. The auction begins and Elihas is alerted to their presence on the compound. They are instantly overrun by the super soldiers. Hulk and Amadeus join the fight and Elihas activates the mind control technology. Punisher shields Widow while Hulk is protected by a nano-device coating over his eyes that Amadeus created to block the broadcast signals. Punisher and Widow use it on themselves before being attacked by more soldiers. Widow goes after Elihas and they fight on a catwalk above where the batch of super-soldiers for the auction are being kept. Elihas kicks Widow over the catwalk's railing but she manages to hold on. Realising he still loves her, Elihas pulls Widow to safety and they kiss. The two team up to retrieve an emergency kill-switch from Orion that Elihas created as a safety precaution against the super-soldiers. Hawkeye, Iron Man, Thor, War Machine and Captain Marvel arrive and breach the auction hall. Together with Punisher, Hulk, and Amadeus, they battle the Leviathan troops. Orion attacks Widow and Elihas when they confront him, but they are able to gain control of the switch and activate it, disabling all the active bio-soldiers. Punisher locates and attempts to shoot Elihas, which distracts Widow who is still fighting Orion. Orion fires a fatal blast at her, but Elihas jumps in the way and is hit instead. Punisher kills Orion and Elihas dies in Widow's arms.

In the aftermath, Fury orders Widow to arrest Punisher, who faces life in prison for killing Orion. She instead releases him once Fury leaves, saying "It's because you do things your way, and I do things my way…", and throws his handcuffs into the ocean. Later in Miami, Punisher tracks down Cain and kills him.

Cast

In addition, Thor, War Machine, Captain Marvel, Grim Reaper, Graviton, Griffin, Taskmaster, Count Nefaria, and Baron Helmut Zemo also appear in uncredited roles.

Crew
 Jamie Simone – Casting and Voice Director

Featurettes
The discs contains two featurettes: "Espionage and Punishment" and "The Vigilante Vs. The Spy", while the Blu-ray features an additional bonus, the Conceptual Art Gallery. "Espionage and Punishment" shows the adaptation of the characters to anime and a "making of" film including early concept art and storyboards. "The Vigilante Vs. The Spy" profiles Frank Castle (The Punisher) and Natasha Romanoff (Black Widow).

Reception

IGN awarded it a score of 8 out of 10, saying "Avengers Confidential: Black Widow and Punisher is a complex and effective animated offering from Marvel." Den of Geek awarded it a more negative score of 2 out of 5, criticising the dialogue and characterisation but praising the fight scenes.

The film earned $723,507 from domestic DVD sales and $635,698 from domestic Blu-ray sales, bringing its total domestic home video sales to $1,359,205.

References

External links
 
 
 

2014 films
2014 animated films
2014 anime OVAs
2014 direct-to-video films
2010s direct-to-video animated superhero films
Superheroes in anime and manga
Animated films based on Marvel Comics
Avengers (comics) films
Direct-to-video animated films
Madhouse (company)
Japanese animated superhero films
Punisher films
Black Widow (Marvel Comics)
Films based on works by Stan Lee
Films set in a fictional country
Films set in New York City
Films set in Russia
Films set in Istanbul
Films set in Hong Kong
Films set in Singapore
2010s crime drama films
Anime films based on comics
Sony Pictures Entertainment Japan films
2014 drama films
Japanese direct-to-video films
Superhero drama films
2010s American films